The LaSalle Cardinals are LaSalle's baseball team in the Ligue de Baseball Élite du Québec. They play their games at Stade Eloi Viau.

Notable alumni
Russell Martin, MLB catcher with Toronto Blue Jays, previously with Pittsburgh Pirates New York Yankees and Los Angeles Dodgers

References
Lanciault, Jacques (2008-02-11). "Mais d'où proviennent les onze équipes de la LBÉQ (1 de 2)" (in French). Ligue de Baseball Élite du Québec. https://web.archive.org/web/20110713192410/http://www.lbeq.com/index.php?corps=nouvelle&P_ZONE_MENU=0&P_ZONE_SMENU=4&P_AFFICHE_DATE=0&FORM=0. Retrieved 2009-03-28.

Baseball teams in Montreal
LaSalle, Quebec